"Ain't Nobody" is a song by American R&B recording artist Faith Evans. It was written by Evans and produced by Sean Combs and Chucky Thompson for her debut studio album Faith (1995). Released as the album's third single along with "Kissing You", the song peaked at number 67 on the US Billboard Hot 100 chart and number 14 on the Hot R&B/Hip-Hop Songs chart.

Track listings
US CD Maxi single
"Ain't Nobody" (Album Version)	- 5:13
"Ain't Nobody (Who Could Love Me)" [feat. Queen Latifah]  (Puffy & Chucky Remix) - 4:18
"Kissing You" (Album Version) - 3:23
"Ain't Nobody (Who Could Love Me)" (Puffy & Chucky Remix Instrumental) - 3:56
"Ain't Nobody" (Album Instrumental) - 5:12

US CD single
"Ain't Nobody" - 5:13
"Kissing You" - 3:23

Credits
Producer – Chucky Thompson and Sean "Puffy" Combs (tracks: 1,2,4,5), Babyface (tracks: 3)
Remix – Chucky Thompson and Sean "Puffy" Combs (tracks: 2,4)

Notes
Track 3 taken from the motion picture soundtrack, "Waiting to Exhale".

Track source

Charts

Weekly charts

Year-end charts

References

1996 singles
Bad Boy Records singles
Faith Evans songs
Songs written by Sean Combs
Songs written by Faith Evans
1995 songs
Songs written by Chucky Thompson